The Microjet 200 was a French jet trainer designed and built by Microjet SA.

Design and development
The aircraft was designed by Microjet SA as a vehicle for the small gas turbine engines produced by Microturbo and as a two-seat lightweight jet trainer. The 200 is a low-wing cantilever monoplane with a retractable tricycle landing gear and a v-tail. It is powered by two Microturbo TRS 18-1 turbojets. It had side-by-side seating for an instructor and student. The all-wood prototype 200 first flew on 24 June 1980. Three pre-production aircraft designated 200B were built of mixed construction and the first flew on 19 May 1983.  The third had small winglets on the tail. The project failed to gain any interest and no production aircraft were built.

Variants
200
Prototype, one built.
200B
Pre-production, three built.

Specifications (200B)

References

Further reading

External links

Minijets - Microjet 200

1980s French military trainer aircraft
V-tail aircraft
Microjet 200
Single-engined jet aircraft
Low-wing aircraft
Aircraft first flown in 1980